Konthe Road (formerly Merchant Road) is an east–west road in downtown Yangon, Burma. It runs past Maha Bandula Park.

Streets in Yangon